Jérémy Houzé (born 22 October 1996) is a Belgian footballer who plays for Mouscron-Péruwelz in the Belgian Pro League, as a midfielder.

External links

1996 births
Living people
Belgian footballers
Royal Excel Mouscron players
Belgian Pro League players
Association football defenders